The Night of the Living Duck is a six-minute 1988 Merrie Melodies cartoon starring Daffy Duck, directed by Greg Ford and Terry Lennon. It was released to theatres as a part of Daffy Duck's Quackbusters on September 24, 1988 and precedes the film in all of its releases.

The title is a pun on Night of the Living Dead, although the cartoon has nothing to do with said film's theme of a zombie apocalypse.

This short was also one of Mel Blanc's final performances, as it was released less than a year before his death.

Plot
Daffy Duck, indulging in his comic book fandom in a sequence reminiscent of his earlier film The Great Piggy Bank Robbery, is reading a scary comic book called "Hideous Tales" (issue #176). The comic's "Noseman" story ends in a cliffhanger involving Schmodzilla and Daffy rifles his bookcase looking for the next issue ("It's a veritable collector's item!"). While doing so however, a monster clock falls and beans Daffy, knocking him out.

In his dream, Daffy finds himself as the featured act in a nightclub where the customers are classic movie monsters consisting of Count Dracula and his two brides, Frankenstein's monster and his bride, the Wolf Man, Imhotep's mummy form, the Gill-man, the Fly, Medusa (who has a petrified man nearby her), Leatherface, the Invisible Man, the Headless Horseman, a cyclops, a slime monster (possibly the Blob), a two-headed man, some skeletons, and some unidentified monsters as well as Alfred E. Neuman. Daffy appears unable to sing, but there is a bottle of "Eau de Tormé" in Daffy's dressing room, which makes him sing like Mel Tormé. After drinking the spray's entire contents for maximum effect, he sings "Monsters Lead Such Interesting Lives" to the room with a ghost named "Ghouley" playing the piano. The monsters love the song.

Then he goes around the room, greeting the patrons. But his good-natured ribbing of Schmodzilla does not go over well with the giant lizard when Daffy quips things like "Say, Schmod baby, leveled any major cities lately?", "You know, Schmodzilla's just like any unemployed actor, except when he pounds the pavement, it registers a ten on the Richter scale!", "Oh, what's the matter? The public not buying those cheap special effects anymore?" Schmodzilla then eats Daffy (with recycled screams from Boobs in the Woods).

Daffy wakes up to find himself stuck in a wastebasket along with the comic he was looking for (Hideous Tales issue #177) with "Schmodzilla" on the cover. Daffy scoffs and Schmodzilla on the cover comes to life saying "You were expecting maybe Calvin Coolidge?"

References

External links
 The Night of the Living Duck at Internet Movie Database

Merrie Melodies short films
Animated crossover films
1988 films
1988 animated films
1988 short films
1980s monster movies
Films scored by Carl Stalling
Films scored by Milt Franklyn
Daffy Duck films
Warner Bros. Animation animated short films
1980s Warner Bros. animated short films
1980s English-language films